Carnegie Hall '71 is a live album by Alice Coltrane. It was recorded at Carnegie Hall in New York City on February 21, 1971, and was released in 2018 by the Hi Hat label. On the album, Coltrane appears on piano and harp, and is joined by saxophonists Pharoah Sanders and Archie Shepp, bassists Jimmy Garrison and Cecil McBee, and drummers Ed Blackwell and Clifford Jarvis.

The album, which consists of a single track documenting a performance of John Coltrane's "Africa", was recorded at a benefit for Swami Satchidanda's Integral Yoga Institute that also featured Laura Nyro and The New Rascals. Regarding Coltrane's band, a concert reviewer for Billboard wrote: "This was one of the greatest assemblages to appear on the Carnegie Hall stage."

In 2021, the album was reissued by the Alternative Fox label with the title Live at Carnegie Hall, 1971.

Reception

In a review for All About Jazz, Chris May wrote: "The performance has much of the ferocity of the original recording, Africa / Brass," but noted that "Sanders and Shepp cannot match the massed intensity of the original frontline."

Tyler Wilcox of Pitchfork called the album "a wild, extended roller coaster ride through John's 'Africa,' featuring bracing solos from Pharoah Sanders and Archie Shepp," and commented: "Carnegie Hall would never be the same."

A reviewer for Doom and Gloom from the Tomb commented: "It's an intense ride, as perhaps is obvious from the players involved! Recording quality is excellent, capturing an historic occasion."

A writer for Pan African Music stated that the album "is a splendid and ecstatic memento of spiritual jazz with some of its greatest masters. The splitting horns, wild drums, and clamouring piano are a vivid display of virtuosity in motion."

Track listing

 "Africa" (John Coltrane) – 28:35

Personnel 
 Alice Coltrane – piano, harp
 Pharoah Sanders – tenor saxophone, soprano saxophone, flute, percussion
 Archie Shepp – tenor saxophone, soprano saxophone, percussion
 Jimmy Garrison – bass
 Cecil McBee – bass
 Ed Blackwell – drums
 Clifford Jarvis – drums
 Kumar Kramer – harmonium
 Tulsi – tamboura

References

2018 live albums
Alice Coltrane live albums
Albums recorded at Carnegie Hall